Harrison Joseph Bader (born June 3, 1994) is an American professional baseball center fielder for the New York Yankees of Major League Baseball (MLB). He has previously played in MLB for the St. Louis Cardinals.

Born and raised in Bronxville, New York, Bader played college baseball at the University of Florida. The Cardinals selected him in the third round of the 2015 MLB draft, and he made his MLB debut with them in 2017. Bader was their starting center fielder for parts of five seasons, and won a Gold Glove Award in 2021. The Cardinals traded Bader to the Yankees in 2022. Bader committed to play for Team Israel in the 2023 World Baseball Classic in Miami in March 2023.

Early life
Bader was born in the village of Bronxville, New York, in the town of Eastchester. Bader's father Louis Bader is Jewish, and his mother Janice is Italian (Sicilian). Both of his parents are originally from Bensonhurst, Brooklyn. His father is the lead counsel for Verizon in New York. He has a younger sister, Sasha.  He is also a first cousin once removed of actor Scott Baio, who played Chachi Arcola on Happy Days and Charles on the 1980s television program Charles in Charge.

He started in baseball with his father throwing batting practice to him when Bader was five years old. He played shortstop in the Eastchester Little League as a youth, with his father continuing to throw him batting practice every evening. Bader grew up a fan of the New York Yankees, and his favorite player was outfielder Roger Maris.

Bader attended the Horace Mann School in the Riverdale neighborhood of the Bronx in New York City, and played as a center fielder for the school's baseball team. As a senior, he batted .500 with a .783 slugging percentage. He was named first-team all-region, first-team all-state, first-team all-city, and to the 2012 Rawlings Northeast All-Region First Team. While attending high school, Bader also played for the New York Grays, a travel baseball team.

College
In October 2011, Bader committed to the University of Pittsburgh to play for the Panthers baseball team. However, he had not signed a National Letter of Intent. He decommitted from Pittsburgh in May 2012, and committed to the University of Maryland to play for the Terrapins. However, Maryland did not offer him a scholarship. In July, he therefore decommitted from Maryland, and committed to the University of Florida to play for the Gators, inasmuch as Florida in contrast offered him a partial scholarship.

Bader led the Gators with a .312 batting average in 221 at-bats as a freshman, with 15 stolen bases (10th in the Southeastern Conference), and was named to the All-SEC Freshman Team. He again led the team, with a .337 average (sixth in the Conference) in 169 at-bats with a .421 on-base percentage (sixth) as a sophomore, and was named All-SEC Second Team. In 2014, his sophomore year, Bader was suspended for 19 games after a scooter accident that occurred while he was driving under the influence of alcohol. After the 2014 season, he played collegiate summer baseball with the Bourne Braves of the Cape Cod Baseball League.

As a junior in 2015, he batted .297/.393/.566 (10th in the Conference) in 256 at-bats with 17 home runs (third), 66 RBIs (third), and 10 hit by pitch (eighth) in 67 games. Bader was named to the All-Tournament Team in the 2015 College World Series after he batted .348 in five games. He was named a second-team All-American by Perfect Game, and a third-team All-American by the National Collegiate Baseball Writers Association (NCBWA).

In his three seasons with the school, Bader became the 11th player in school history to record over 20 home runs, over 100 RBIs, and over 30 steals over his career.

Professional career

Minor leagues
In the 2015 Major League Baseball draft, the St. Louis Cardinals selected Bader in the third round, with the 100th overall selection. He signed with the Cardinals, receiving a $400,000 signing bonus, and made his professional debut with the State College Spikes of the Class A-Short Season New York–Penn League, hitting two home runs in his first game. The Cardinals promoted Bader to the Peoria Chiefs of the Class A Midwest League (MWL) in July, and for the season with Peoria he was 10th in the League with nine home runs and eighth with a .505 slugging percentage, in 206 at-bats. He was the MWL Player of the Week for August 24–30 after batting .448 in seven games with two home runs, six RBIs, one double, and two triples. In 235 at-bats and 61 total games between State College and Peoria, he batted .311/.368/.523 with 13 doubles, 11 home runs, 32 RBIs, and 17 stolen bases. He was named an MiLB 2015 Organization All Star.

Bader began the 2016 season with the Springfield Cardinals of the Class AA Texas League, with whom his .497 slugging percentage was 9th-highest in the league and his 10 hit by pitch, in 318 at-bats, was second in the league. He had a hit streak in April 2016 that fell one game short of tying the Springfield club record. Bader was named a Texas League mid-season All-Star, and in the All Star Game he collected four hits in five at-bats with a double and a run scored. He was promoted to the Class AAA Memphis Redbirds on July 6, 2016. In their updated 2016 mid-season ranking, Baseball America rated Bader in the top 100 for the first time, at 89th. Bader finished the 2016 season batting a combined .267 with 19 home runs and 58 RBIs in 465 at-bats over 131 games between Memphis and Springfield. MLB Pipeline named him the Cardinals 2016 Minor League Player of the Year, and he was named an MiLB 2016 Organization All Star. After the season, the Cardinals assigned Bader to the Glendale Desert Dogs of the Arizona Fall League (AFL), for whom he batted .304/.349/.430 with 16 RBIs (5th in the league) in 79 at-bats. He was named an AFL 2016 Rising Star, and to the AFL 2016 All-Prospect Team.

Bader began 2017 back with Memphis, batting .283/.347/.469 with 74 runs and 20 home runs (both andond among Cardinals minor leaguers), 55 RBIs, and 15 stolen bases in 431 at-bats while playing primarily center field. He was ranked the #8 prospect in the Cardinals organization by Baseball America. After the season, the Cardinals named Bader their 2017 Minor League Player of the Year.

St. Louis Cardinals

2017: MLB debut

On July 25, 2017, the Cardinals promoted Bader to the major leagues to take the place of the injured Dexter Fowler. Bader had been batting .297 with 19 home runs and 48 RBIs in 97 games at Memphis before his promotion. That night, he started in center field and batted seventh, and recorded his first major league hit, a double, and scored the winning run on a walk-off sacrifice fly against the Colorado Rockies. He hit his first MLB home run, a 395-foot shot to left field, on September 1, 2017, off Johnny Cueto, leading the Cardinals to an 11–6 win over the San Francisco Giants at AT&T Park. In 2017, in which he had 85 at-bats for the Cardinals, his sprint speed was 30.0 feet/second, 10th-fastest of all major leaguers with 25 or more competitive runs.

2018: Baseball America and Topps All-Star Rookie Teams
MLB.com ranked Bader as the Cardinals 5th-best prospect going into the 2018 season, which he began with Memphis. The Cardinals promoted him to the major leagues on April 3, after an injury to Jedd Gyorko.
After his call-up, Bader first became St. Louis' fourth outfielder, then their starting center fielder after Tommy Pham was traded on July 31. He scored from second base on an infield single by Austin Gomber at Colorado on August 26; at the end of the season, he was the Cardinals' MLBPAA Heart & Hustle Award nominee.

Bader finished his 2018 rookie campaign batting .264 with 12 home runs, 37 RBIs, and 15 stolen bases in 138 games. His stolen base percentage of 83.3% was the 4th-best in the NL. His sprint speed was 30.1 feet/second, second-fastest (behind Adam Engel) of all major leaguers with 100 or more competitive runs. On defense, he ranked 4th among MLB outfielders with 19 Defensive Runs Saved. He led the major leagues in 5-star catches (7), and was tied for first in Outs Above Average (21) according to Statcast.

Among National League rookie leaders, Bader was in the top five in runs (61; fourth), doubles (20; fifth), home runs (12; fifth), and extra base hits (34; fifth). He tied for the National League lead among rookies with eight outfield assists. His 15 stolen bases as a rookie were the most by a Cardinal since Kolten Wong in 2014, and his 100 hits were the most since Colby Rasmus in 2009. Bader was named to the Baseball America 2008 All-Star Rookie Team and the Topps 2018 All-Star Rookie Team, and came in 6th in the voting for NL Rookie of the Year.

2019: Baseball America NL Best Defensive Outfielder
Bader began 2019 as St. Louis' starting center fielder. However, he struggled at the plate, and was eventually moved into a bench role. On July 30, he was demoted to Memphis after slashing .195/.309/.648 with six home runs and 19 RBIs over 90 games. With Memphis he played in 16 games, batting .317/.427/.698 in 63 at-bats with seven home runs and 15 RBIs, and 3-for-3 in stolen bases. He was recalled to St. Louis on August 20. In his first game after being called back up, Bader hit a triple, scored two runs, and walked three times in a 9–4 win over the Milwaukee Brewers.

Bader finished the 2019 regular season with St. Louis, batting .205/.314/.366 with 12 home runs, 39 RBIs, 11 stolen bases, and 13 hit by pitches over 128 games. He was one of eight major league players to record double-digit totals in home runs, stolen bases, and hit by pitches. His sprint speed was 29.5 feet/second, 11th-fastest of all major leaguers with 100 or more competitive runs.

On defense, he again had eight outfield assists (2nd among NL outfielders), and led National League outfielders with four double plays, the most by a Cardinals outfielder since Jim Edmonds had five in 2003, as Bader played all 122 games in center field. His .956 zone rating was the highest by a Cardinals outfielder since the category was first tracked in 1987. He was named the "Best Defensive Outfielder" in the National League in Baseball America'''s 2019 Best Tools survey of managers, coaches, scouts, and executives. He also received his first nomination and was a finalist for a Rawlings Gold Glove.

2020
Bader returned as the starting center fielder in the COVID-19 pandemic-shortened 2020 season, slashing .226/.336/.443 with two triples (10th in the NL), four home runs, and 11 RBIs over 50 games. His 29.5 feet/second sprint speed was seventh-fastest in major league baseball, of all players with 25 or more competitive runs. On defense, he had two assists (fifth among NL center fielders), and a zone rating of .974 (second among NL outfielders).

2021: Gold Glove Award
During spring training 2021, Bader strained his right forearm and missed the start of the regular season. He returned to play on April 30, but fractured a rib while diving for a ball in a May 26 game against the Chicago White Sox. Reactivated and returned to the starting lineup on July 1, he hit his first career grand slam, helping the Cardinals to a 9–3 win over the Rockies at Coors Field. Bader was named the National League Player of the Week for the first time on September 27. The prior week he batted 15-for-29, hitting .517/.548/ 1.000, with 10 runs and three home runs in eight games, and helped the Cardinals win a franchise-record 17th consecutive game. In October 2021, Will Leitch wrote for MLB: "Bader is a defensive dynamo, a base-running terror and a complete joy to watch. Who's more fun than this?"

Bader finished the 2021 season with 367 at-bats over 103 games, slashing .267/.324/.460 with 16 home runs, 50 RBIs, 21 doubles, nine stolen bases, and 6 intentional walks (8th in the NL). His sprint speed of 29.5 feet/second was 6th-fastest in major league baseball, of all players with 100 or more competitive runs.

On defense, Bader's .973 zone rating was the highest by any Major League outfielder in history since the category began being tracked in 1987. He led major league baseball outfielders in SABR defensive index (14.4), ultimate zone rating (11.4), putouts/9 innings (2.93), range factor/9 (2.97), and zone rating (.973). He led NL outfielders in outs above average (13) and runs prevented (12), and was 3rd in defensive runs saved (15).

Bader won the Gold Glove Award in center field, one of five Cardinals (an MLB record) to win the award. He was the first Cardinals center fielder to win a Gold Glove since Jim Edmonds in 2000–05.

2022: traded
On April 3, 2022, Bader and the Cardinals agreed to a two-year, $10.4 million contract to avoid arbitration. Bader hit an inside-the-park home run on May 10, the first by a Cardinal since Vince Coleman in 1985, and the only one by a Cardinal in Busch Stadium III. On June 27, the Cardinals put Bader on the 10-day injured list due to plantar fasciitis in his right foot.

At the time of his trade he was batting .256/.303/.370 with five home runs in 246 at-bats, with 15 stolen bases (fifth in the NL) in 17 attempts, and had been error-less in center field.

New York Yankees
On August 2, 2022, the Cardinals traded Bader and a player to be named later for cash considerations to the New York Yankees for pitcher Jordan Montgomery. On September 20, Bader had his first New York Yankees hit, driving in a run. He had the fastest sprint speed of all Yankees with 25 or more runs, at 29.1 feet per second.

Bader hit his first New York Yankees home run in Game 1 of the 2022 American League Division Series off of Cal Quantrill of the Cleveland Guardians. He hit three home runs in the first four games of the series, joining Bernie Williams and Mickey Mantle as the only Yankee center fielders with three homers in a single postseason. He hit a fourth postseason home run in the first game of the 2022 American League Championship Series, becoming the first Yankee ever to hit four home runs in his first six postseason games. In the ALCS he hit a fifth home run in the fourth game, and batted .400/.471/.800 for the series.

 International career 
In July 2022, Bader committed to play for Team Israel in the 2023 World Baseball Classic in Miami starting March 11–15. He will be playing for Team Israel manager and former All Star Ian Kinsler, and alongside All Star outfielder Joc Pederson, pitcher Dean Kremer, and others. Bader later withdrew from consideration.

Personal life
While with the Cardinals, Bader partnered with Sonic Drive-In to sell "Bader Tots" at participating St. Louis area locations.

References

External links

Harrison Bader (October 4, 2021). "All that Matters is what Happens Next," The Players' Tribune''.

1994 births
Living people
Baseball players from New York (state)
American people of Italian descent
Gold Glove Award winners
Jewish American sportspeople
Jewish Major League Baseball players
Lakeshore Chinooks players
Major League Baseball outfielders
Memphis Redbirds players
New York Yankees players
People from Bronxville, New York
Peoria Chiefs players
Springfield Cardinals players
St. Louis Cardinals players
Florida Gators baseball players
Bourne Braves players
State College Spikes players
Glendale Desert Dogs players
American Roman Catholics
People of Sicilian descent